The President of the Board of Control was a British government official in the late 18th and early 19th centuries responsible for overseeing the British East India Company and generally serving as the chief official in London responsible for Indian affairs. The position was frequently a cabinet level one. The position was abolished in 1858 with the abolition of the East India Company. It was succeeded by the new position of Secretary of State for India.

List of presidents of the Board of Control 

Lord Stanley took up the new post of Secretary of State for India on 2 August 1858, upon the establishment of the British Raj.

References

Lists of government ministers of the United Kingdom
British East India Company
Defunct ministerial offices in the United Kingdom
Government of British India